Johannishus is a locality situated in Ronneby Municipality, Blekinge County, Sweden with 748 inhabitants in 2010. Johannishus castle is situated some kilometers north of locality. There exist a school for 150 pupils and a library.

The locality is also seat of the Hjortsberga natur-& kulturförening (Hjortsberga nature and culture club). The club is recording and publishing information on the history of the localities Hjortsberga, Johannishus, Edestad, Förkärla and Listerby.

References 

Populated places in Ronneby Municipality